The 1813 New York gubernatorial election was held in April 1813 to elect the Governor and Lieutenant Governor of New York.

Candidates
The Democratic-Republican Party nominated incumbent Daniel D. Tompkins. They nominated former state senator (and former briefly acting Lieutenant Governor) John Tayler for Lieutenant Governor.

The Federalist Party nominated former Lieutenant Governor Stephen Van Rensselaer. They nominated George Huntington for Lieutenant Governor.

Results
The Democratic-Republican ticket of Tompkins and Tayler was elected.

Sources
Result: The Tribune Almanac 1841

See also
New York gubernatorial elections
New York state elections

1813
New York
Gubernatorial election
April 1813 events